The Campeonato Cearense is the football league of the state of Ceará, Brazil.

Format

The Campeonato Cearense has three divisions with the following division and format (as in any other Brazilian soccer championship, the format can change every year):

First Division

The ten clubs play two legs. In each leg there are three stages:

First stage: All teams play each other one time.
Second stage: Two-legged knockout with the top 4 teams of the first stage (1st x 4th and 2nd x 3rd).
Third stage: Two-legged knockout with the second stage winners.

The winners of the third stage are leg champions.

The two leg champions decide the state championship final in two games. If a team wins the two legs is a state champion with no championship final necessary.

The two teams last placed in all championship are relegated.

Second Division

The ten clubs play three stages.

First stage: All teams play each other home-and-away game.
Second stage: The top six teams of the first stage play each other home-and-away game.
Third stage: The top two of second stage play the Second Division Final and are promoted to first division.

The two teams last placed in all championship are relegated.

Third Division

The sixteen clubs play two stages.

First stage: All teams are divided in 4 groups of 4 teams each. Each team play home-and-away game in its group. The top two of each group are classified to second stage.
Second stage: The eight clubs are divided in 2 groups of 4 teams each. Each team play home-and-away game in its group. The top two of each group are classified to third stage.
Third stage: Top four clubs play home-and-away game and the two first are promoted to second division.

Clubs
2022 First Division
Futebol Clube Atlético Cearense
Caucaia Esporte Clube
Ceará Sporting Club
Crato Esporte Clube
Ferroviário Atlético Clube
Fortaleza Esporte Clube
Associação Desportiva Recreativa e Cultural Icasa
Associação Desportiva Iguatu
Maracanã Esporte Clube
Pacajus Esporte Clube

List of champions

Notes

Icasa EC was refounded as ADRC Icasa in 2002. 
Ceará titles from 1915 to 1919 were only recognized in 2008.
Uniclinic is the currently Atlético Cearense.

Titles by team

Teams in bold stills active.

By city

References

External links
FCF Official Website

 
Cearense